Haven B. Howe House is a historic home located at Claytor Lake State Park, near Dublin, Pulaski County, Virginia. It was built between 1876 and 1879, and is a two-story, brick dwelling with Italianate style detailing. It has a rear brick ell and projecting one-story bays on both end walls. It features ornamental wrought iron porch supports.  Also on the property are three contributing limestone mounting blocks. The property, located on Claytor Lake, was conveyed to the Virginia Conservation Commission in 1947.  The house is used as a Nature Exhibit Center that focuses on the lake's wildlife habitat.

It was added to the National Register of Historic Places in 2008.

References

Houses on the National Register of Historic Places in Virginia
Houses completed in 1879
Italianate architecture in Virginia
Houses in Pulaski County, Virginia
National Register of Historic Places in Pulaski County, Virginia